There are 350 listed buildings (Swedish: byggnadsminne) in Gotland County.

Visby
placeholder

Outside Visby

External links

  Bebyggelseregistret

Listed buildings in Sweden